Voloka (or Voloca) is a village in Chernivtsi Raion, Chernivtsi Oblast, Ukraine. It hosts the administration of Voloka rural hromada, one of the hromadas of Ukraine.

The current population of the village is 3,035 (3,028 at the time of the 2001 Ukrainian census).

Most inhabitants are Romanians and they are almost exclusively engaged in the creation of bridal gowns, a business that has proved quite successful in the past decade, as the village has managed to make a name for itself in almost all of Ukraine and Russia as well as Romania.

Until 18 July 2020, Voloka belonged to Hlyboka Raion. The raion was abolished in July 2020 as part of the administrative reform of Ukraine, which reduced the number of raions of Chernivtsi Oblast to three. The area of Hlyboka Raion was merged into Chernivtsi Raion.

References

Villages in Chernivtsi Raion